Cypress is an unincorporated community in Franklin County, in the U.S. state of Texas. According to the Handbook of Texas, the community had a population of 20 in 2000.

History
The area in what is now known as Cypress today was first settled in the 1850s and was named for the nearby Cypress Creek, which flowed through the community until Lake Cypress Springs was impounded. There were two businesses, a church, and a cemetery in the community in the 1930s. There were no businesses in the community in 1990 and had a population of 20 in 2000.

Geography

Education
In 1896, Cypress had a school with one teacher and 50 students. It also had a school in the 1930s. Today, the community is served by the Mount Vernon Independent School District.

References

Unincorporated communities in Texas
Unincorporated communities in Franklin County, Texas